Barmageddon is an American television game show created and produced by Blake Shelton, Emmy Award winning producer Lee Metzger, and Carson Daly, with Nikki Bella serving as the host. The show premiered on December 5, 2022, on the USA Network.

Production 
On May 12, 2022, it was confirmed that award winning country singer, Blake Shelton and television host Carson Daly would start their own game show named Barmageddon, with WWE Hall of Famer Nikki Bella serving as the host. The show takes place at Ole Red in Nashville, one of the chain bars owned by Shelton. On March 1, 2023, USA Network renewed the series for a second season.

Gameplay 
In a bar-themed game show, two celebrities compete against each other in five pub games, where the winner of the cash prize would choose a viral Internet sensation, where each has chosen to support.

Episodes

Season 1 (2022–23) 
Note: Winners are listed in bold

References

External links 
 
 
 

USA Network original programming
2022 American television series debuts
English-language television shows
2020s American game shows
Pub games